Dominik Stahl (born 20 August 1988) is a German professional footballer who plays as a defensive midfielder for Regionalliga Bayern club SpVgg Unterhaching.

Career

1860 Munich
Stahl was born Hardheim, Baden-Württemberg, but grew up in Osterburken. He joined 1860 Munich at youth level in 2004, after playing for SV Osterburken, TSV Tauberbischofsheim and 1899 Hoffenheim. He progressed through the academy, before moving up to the under-23 team in the Regionalliga Süd in 2007. He would also go on the win the DFB Youth Cup with the under-19 team the same year.

Stahl made his first appearance for the reserves in the Regionalliga Süd on 24 February 2007 in a 2–1 away loss against Karlsruher SC II, starting the game before being substituted in the 70th minute for Ralf Schmitt. In the summer of 2009 he was appointed captain of the under-23 team.

After making 13 appearances as a starter in the Regionalliga Süd during the 2009–10 season, Stahl was called up to the first team for the 2. Bundesliga game of 1860 Munich away against Energie Cottbus on 8 November 2009. There, he made his professional debut as part of Die Löwens starting line-up at Stadion der Freundschaft as his team lost 1–0. In March 2010, he extended his expiring contract with the club until 2012.

In the 2010–11 season, Stahl established himself in defensive midfield, winning the starting position from Florin Lovin. On 30 October 2010, he scored his first professional goal in a game in Karlsruher SC, followed by two more goals in the course of the season. He made a total of 22 appearances that season, with another three games played for the under-23 team in October 2010.

In September 2011, Stahl signed another two-year contract extension, keeping him at 1860 Munich until 2014. 

Stahl experienced a particularly strong start to the 2013–14 season, as he managed to score the game-winning goal in four consecutive matches in November and December 2013. 

Stahl's contract with 1860 Munich expired on 30 June 2016 and was not renewed, which meant that he left the club after 12 years, in which he made a total of 131 appearances and 10 goals.

SpVgg Unterhaching
On 7 July 2016, Stahl signed a three-year contract with an option for an additional year with Regionalliga Bayern club SpVgg Unterhaching. He made his competitive debut for the club on 23 July, scoring the opening goal in a 5–1 home win against VfR Garching.

He signed a contract extension on 13 April 2020, keeping him at the club until 2022. In June 2020, he tore his anterior cruciate ligament, sidelining him for an extended period.

Career statistics

HonoursSpVgg Unterhaching'
 Regionalliga Bayern: 2016–17

References

External links

 
 Dominik Stahl at SpVgg Unterhaching

1988 births
Living people
German footballers
Footballers from Baden-Württemberg
Association football midfielders
TSV 1860 Munich II players
TSV 1860 Munich players
TSG 1899 Hoffenheim players
SpVgg Unterhaching players
2. Bundesliga players
Regionalliga players
3. Liga players